Ron Fassler (born March 4, 1957 in New York City) is an American film and television actor and author. He is best known for his role as Bryan Grazer, the LAPD captain in the Fox Network cult science fiction TV series Alien Nation. The series was canceled after a short run, but Fox brought it back in 1994 in a series of five TV movies. Fassler reprised his role as Captain Grazer in Alien Nation: Dark Horizon (1994), Alien Nation: Body and Soul (1995), Alien Nation: Millennium (1996), Alien Nation: The Enemy Within (1996), and Alien Nation: The Udara Legacy (1997).

His first TV role was in the 1981 TV movie Senior Trip, which also starred "Alien Nation" co-star Jeff Marcus. 
Seen as Ted Koppel in  2009'sWatchmen, Fassler's first feature film appearance was in the 1990 comedy move Gremlins 2: The New Batch (1990). Other recent films include Charlie Wilson's War (2008), Hancock (2008), Walk Hard: The Dewey Cox Story (2007), For Your Consideration (2006) and Flags of Our Fathers (2006).
Fassler has made many guest appearances on TV shows ranging from NYPD Blue to The Facts of Life, Matlock, 7th Heaven and Star Trek: Voyager, along with recurring roles on Sisters and the recent critically acclaimed Side Order of Life. He even did multiple episodes of The Young and the Restless as Justin Johns.
As a writer, Fassler co-wrote the Lifetime TV movie, How I Married My High School Crush (2007) and also wrote for the sitcom Murphy Brown.

More recently, Fassler had a recurring role on the Disney XD sitcom Zeke and Luther where he played reporter Dale Davis. This role has also carried over to other Disney XD sitcoms including Kickin' It and Pair of Kings. Fassler also appeared in the 2015 movie Trumbo.

In recent years, Fassler has been directing shows at Priscilla Beach Theatre.

His book "Up in the Cheap Seats: A Historical Memoir of Broadway" which chronicles Fassler's years as a teenage theatregoer, and includes interviews with more than 100 Broadway theatre artists, was published in February, 2017.

Film

Television

External links
 

1957 births
American male film actors
American male television actors
Male actors from New York City
Living people